A Circular review system is a system on board some armoured combat vehicles or tanks which provides the crew greater situational awareness (such as a 360° view) outside of the vehicle.

Differing systems may provide panoramic or enhanced imagery, Blue Force Tracking, marking of enemy positions, target acquisition, coordination of fire between networked combat vehicles, or enhanced threat recognition.

Imagery may be provided by sensors on the vehicle, or from external UAVs or UGVs. Information may be presented on helmet-mounted or other display systems.

See also
 Augmented reality
Artificial Intelligence

References

External links
  360° View through Armor
 Circular review system for vehicles

Applications of computer vision
Augmented reality
User interface techniques
Weapons